Mahmoud Marei is an Egyptian footballer who plays for Egyptian Premier League side Future FC as a center defender.

Biography 
Mahmoud Marei was born on April 24 1998 in Egypt. He started his football career at the youth club of Wadi Degla SC. He was promoted to the first team in the 2017/2018 season where he played for years, with over one hundred appearances before moving to Future FC. He also played for the Egypt national under-20 football team during the 2017 Africa U-20 Cup of Nations where he played three matches against Mali, Guinea and Zambia.

Trophies 
In 2019, he won the CAF U-23 Cup of Nations with the Egyptian team and in the 2021/2022 season he won EFA League Cup with the Future FC.

References 

Living people
Egyptian football biography stubs
Egyptian Premier League players
Future FC (Egypt) players
Wadi Degla SC players
1998 births